The 1998 Lafayette Leopards football team was an American football team that represented Lafayette College during the 1998 NCAA Division I-AA football season. The Leopards tied for third in the Patriot League. 

In their 18th year under head coach Bill Russo, the Leopards compiled a 3–8 record. Angel Colon, Damian Wroblewski and Andy Zabinski were the team captains.

The Leopards were outscored 271 to 190. Their 3–3 conference record tied for third place in the seven-team Patriot League standings. 

Lafayette played its home games at Fisher Field on College Hill in Easton, Pennsylvania.

Schedule

References

Lafayette
Lafayette Leopards football seasons
Lafayette Leopards football